Timothy P. Boyle (born 1949) is an American billionaire, and the president and CEO of Columbia Sportswear.

According to Forbes, his estimated net worth was US$2.0 billion in November 2022.

Early life
Boyle was born and raised in Portland, Oregon. He is one of three children of Joseph Cornelius "Neal" Boyle, an Irish Catholic, and Gertrude Lamfrom. His mother was Jewish and fled as a teenager from Nazi Germany. She immigrated to Portland, Oregon, and converted to Catholicism after marrying her husband. He has two sisters: Kathy Boyle (born 1952) and Sally Boyle (born 1958).

His grandfather purchased the Rosenfeld Hat Company and changed its name to the Columbia Hat Company (after the river). His father became president of Columbia Hat after his grandfather died and then diversified the hat business into outerwear for hunters, fishermen, and skiers. In 1960, his mother designed the first fishing vest (his father was an avid fisherman) and the name of the company was changed to Columbia Sportswear.

Boyle was educated at Jesuit High School, in Beaverton, Oregon, just outside Portland, followed by the University of Oregon, where he earned a bachelor's degree in journalism in 1971.

Career
Boyle was still at university when his father died in 1970 at the age of 47. He left to join his mother, who had become president of Columbia Hat, which was then earning $800,000 in annual sales and had 40 employees. The company struggled and teetered on bankruptcy until in the 1970s when Boyle and his mother refocused the business on outdoor clothing and casual wear which paralleled a general trend away from formal work attire. In 1975, they were the first company to introduce Gore-Tex parkas.

In 1986, Columbia released the Bugaboo, a jacket with a zip out lining which became quite trendy and further propelled the company's growth. Columbia was unique among specialty clothing manufacturers in that it would sell its products to any retail shop or chain. In 1987, Columbia had $18.8 million in sales and by 1997 it had grown to $353.5 million. Boyle took over from his mother, Gert, as company president in 1988.

The company went public in 1998. In the early 2010s, Boyle refocused Columbia away from top line products and more towards the mid-range, moderately priced products; he also continued to align sales with changes happening in the retail industry, shifting the company more toward internet sales. 
 
Columbia grew into a $6.5bn public company, and Boyle's 41% ownership interest in Columbia Sportswear was worth over $1.0 billion in 2013.

In 2020, Forbes ranked Boyle No. 378 on the Forbes 400 list of the richest people in America.

Personal life
Boyle and his wife Mary have a son, educated at Drake University in Des Moines, and a daughter, educated at the University of Washington. They live in Portland, Oregon.

In 2007, he and his wife Mary donated $5 million to the University of Oregon. In 2016, he donated $10 million to the University's aquatic animal care facility. More recently the couple donated $10 million towards a biomedical data science initiative. In 2020, due to the COVID-19 pandemic, Boyle reduced his own salary to $10,000 while maintaining the full salary and benefits of all his company's retail employees.

References

1949 births
Living people
20th-century American businesspeople
21st-century American businesspeople
American billionaires
American business executives
American people of German-Jewish descent
American people of Irish descent
Businesspeople from Portland, Oregon
Jesuit High School (Beaverton, Oregon) alumni
University of Oregon alumni